Adam's Venture is an episodic adventure game developed by Vertigo Games, a Dutch indie developer.

Series
 Episode 1: The Search for the Lost Garden, was released on October 2, 2009
 Episode 2: Solomon's Secret was released on April 8, 2011
 Episode 3: Revelations was released on March 9, 2012.
 Chronicles, a compilation of all three episodes in one, with graphic and gameplay improvements, was released on February 4, 2014 for PlayStation 3 and on August 3, 2015 for PC.
 Origins, a reimagining spanning the story of the three episodes, adding a few elements but cutting many others, was released on April 1, 2016 for PlayStation 4, Xbox One and PC. It was later ported to Nintendo Switch on May 29, 2020.

Story
The player directs the young explorer Adam Venture on a quest for the Garden of Eden and Solomon's Temple.

Reception
Episode 1 received mixed reviews from critics, garnering a 52/100 on the review aggregation website Metacritic.

References

External links

2009 video games
2011 video games
2012 video games
Adventure games
Video games developed in the Netherlands
Windows games
Iceberg Interactive games
2016 video games
PlayStation 3 games
PlayStation 4 games
Xbox One games
Nintendo Switch games
Single-player video games
Soedesco games